Statistics of DPR Korea Football League in the 2010 season.

Highest Class Football League
From this season, The name of league changed to Highest Class Football League (Chosŏn'gŭl: 최상급축구련맹전; Hanja: 最上級蹴球聯盟戰).

Clubs
April 25
Amrokkang
Ponghwasan
Ch'ilbosan
Kyŏnggong'ŏp
Kigwanch'a
Man'gyŏngbong
P'yŏngyang City
Rimyŏngsu
Sobaeksu

Cup competitions
Man'gyŏngbong won the Republican Championship. Sobaeksu won the first known edition of the Poch'ŏnbo Torch Prize, with P'yŏngyang City being the runners-up, and Rimyŏngsu won the Man'gyŏngdae Prize.

References

DPR Korea Football League seasons
1
Korea
Korea